Leonard Tupamahu (born 9 July 1983 in Jakarta, Indonesia) is an Indonesian professional footballer who plays as a defender for Liga 1 club Bali United.

Club career 
He has played for Persija from 2004 until 2009. In 2009, he also played futsal for Biangbola in Indonesian Futsal League. In 2010, he joined Arema Malang. On December 12, 2014, he joined Barito Putera.

Honours

Club
Bali United
 Liga 1: 2019, 2021–22

References

External links 
 
 Leonard Tupamahu at Liga Indonesia

1983 births
Living people
Indonesian footballers
Sportspeople from Jakarta
Indonesian men's futsal players
Persija Jakarta players
Persipur Purwodadi players
Persikabo Bogor players
Arema F.C. players
Persema Malang players
Bandung Raya players
Persiram Raja Ampat players
PS Barito Putera players
Borneo F.C. players
Bali United F.C. players
Liga 1 (Indonesia) players
Indonesian Premier League players
Indonesian Premier Division players
Indonesia youth international footballers
Association football defenders